Reflections is the second and final studio album by Terry Knight and the Pack, the short-lived American garage rock band from Flint, Michigan.

Track listing 
Side One
 "One Monkey (Don't Stop No Show)" - (Joe Tex)  - 2:32
 "Love, Love, Love, Love, Love" - (Terry Knight) - 2:40
 "Come With Me" - (Knight) - 2:35
 "Got To Find My Baby" - (Knight) - 2:45
 "This Precious Time" - (P. F. Sloan, Steve Barri) - 2:30
 "Anybody's Appletree" - (Knight) - 2:30
Side Two
 "The Train" - (Knight) - 2:05
 "Dimestore Debutant" - (Knight) - 4:15
 "Love Goddess Of The Sunset Strip" - (Knight) - 3:33
 "Forever And A Day" - (Knight) - 2:58
 "(I Can't Get No) Satisfaction" - (Jagger/Richards) - 3:50

Personnel 
 Terry Knight - vocals, production
 Curt Johnson - guitar
 Bob Caldwell - organ
 Mark Farner - bass
 Don Brewer - drums

References 

1967 albums
Terry Knight and the Pack albums